Bardo State consists of the duo Frank Wijn and Dorian Broekhuyse. Frank is the son of Jan Wijn, a famous Dutch concert pianist, while Dorian attended the conservatory in Amsterdam and has a background in pop and dance music. Dorian used to work with Jocelyn Brown, Victoria Wilson James (Soul II Soul) and George Clinton during the nineties. Raised on musical influences such as Satie, Ravel & Saint-Saëns, the Dutch twosome are also inspired by contemporary composers like Arvo Pärt and Philip Glass. They compose music that is best described as a crossover between pop and classical music. Bardo State works with various classical and pop vocalists, both male and female, including Jo Lemaire and Kevin Mark Trail (The Streets). They use classical themes and traditional folk music to base their music on. 
Bardo State started producing in 2004 and their debut album Mariposa was released in 2008. Their album Mariposa has been reviewed in national as well as in international magazines. Bardo State has among others remixed Radiohead and covered David Bowie and Kate Bush. One of their tracks, "Kosovo", was the soundtrack of the Hollywood film Jekyll and Hyde. Many songs of Bardo State have been licensed for several compilations, such as the "Buddha Bar"- and the "Supperclub" compilations. Two of their singles, "Paradis" and "This Is Not America", were regularly played at Radio 2 (Netherlands) and "Sospiro" was used for a performance by contestants in the Italian TV show Amici.
For the dying individual, the bardo is the period of the afterlife that lies in between two different incarnations. In January 2010 United Recordings went Bankrupt. All handling, rights and communication concerning Bardo State have been taken over by Bardo State Music.

Discography 
Albums

Singles

Remixes

Featuring on compilations

Members 
Frank Wijn (producer)
Dorian Broekhuyse (producer)

Notes and references

External links 
 Official Bardo State website
 Bardo State MySpace page
 Articles on Bardo State

Electronic music duos
Dutch electronic music groups
Musical groups established in 2004